The 1890 Rhode Island gubernatorial election was held on April 2, 1890. Democratic nominee John W. Davis defeated incumbent Republican Herbert W. Ladd with 48.76% of the vote.

General election

Candidates
Major party candidates
John W. Davis, Democratic
Herbert W. Ladd, Republican

Other candidates
John H. Larry, Prohibition
Arnold B. Chace, Union

Results

References

1890
Rhode Island
Gubernatorial